Anse du Clerc is a communal section in the Abricots commune, in the Jérémie Arrondissement, in the Grand'Anse department of Haiti.

References

Communal sections of Haiti
Populated places in Grand'Anse (department)